Daniel "Dani" Gómez Alcón (born 30 July 1998) is a Spanish professional footballer who plays as a forward for RCD Espanyol, on loan from Levante UD.

Club career
Born in Alcorcón, Community of Madrid, Gómez joined Real Madrid's youth setup in 2011, from AD Alcorcón. Promoted to the reserves for the 2017–18 season, he made his senior debut on 19 August 2017, starting and scoring his team's only in a 2–1 Segunda División B home loss against CF Rayo Majadahonda.

On 26 July 2018, Gómez renewed his contract with Los Blancos. On 15 July of the following year, he agreed to a one-year loan deal with Segunda División side CD Tenerife.

Gómez made his professional debut on 17 August 2019, coming on as a second-half substitute for José Naranjo in a 2–0 away loss against Real Zaragoza. He scored his first goal in the second division on 15 September, netting the fourth in a 4–0 away routing of Albacete Balompié.

On 31 July 2020, after scoring 11 goals overall in the previous campaign, Gómez signed a five-year deal with La Liga side Levante UD. On 22 August 2022, after the club's relegation, he moved on loan to RCD Espanyol in the top tier, for one year.

References

External links
Real Madrid profile

1998 births
Living people
People from Alcorcón
Spanish footballers
Footballers from the Community of Madrid
Association football forwards
La Liga players
Segunda División players
Segunda División B players
Real Madrid Castilla footballers
CD Tenerife players
Levante UD footballers
RCD Espanyol footballers
Spain youth international footballers
Spain under-21 international footballers